The 1951 Estonian SSR Football Championship was won by Baltic Fleet Tallinn.

League table

Title play-off

References

Estonian Football Championship
Est
Football